The 1790–91 United States Senate elections were held on various dates in various states. These U.S. Senate elections occurred during the first midterm election cycle, which took place in the middle of President George Washington's first term. As these elections were prior to the ratification of the Seventeenth Amendment in 1913, senators were chosen by state legislatures. Senators were elected over a wide range of time throughout 1790 and 1791, and a seat may have been filled months late or remained vacant due to legislative deadlock. In these elections, terms were up for the nine senators in Class 1.

As of these elections, formal organized political parties had yet to form in the United States, but two political factions were present: The coalition of senators who supported President Washington's administration were known as the Pro-Administration Party, and the senators against him as the Anti-Administration Party.

Change in Senate composition 
Note: There were no political parties in this Congress. Members are informally grouped into factions of similar interest, based on an analysis of their voting record.

Before the elections 
After the June 25, 1790 elections in Rhode Island.

Results of the regular elections

Results of the special elections

Race summaries 
Except if/when noted, the number following candidates is the whole number vote(s), not a percentage.

Regular and special elections during the 1st Congress 
In these elections, the winners were seated before March 4, 1791; ordered by election date.

Races leading to the 2nd Congress 
In these regular elections, the winners were seated March 4, 1791; ordered by state.

All of these elections involved the Class 1 seats.

Special and regular elections in 1791 during the 2nd Congress 
In these elections, the winners were seated after March 4, 1791, the beginning of the next Congress.

Connecticut 

All of the senators from Connecticut were Pro-Administration through 1795.

Connecticut (regular) 

Oliver Ellsworth was re-elected in 1791.

Connecticut (special) 

William Samuel Johnson resigned March 3, 1791, at the end of the 1st Congress and Roger Sherman was elected June 13, 1791, to finish the term.

Delaware

Maryland 

Charles Carroll won re-election over Uriah Forrest by a margin of 20.00%, or 15 votes, for the Class 1 seat.

Massachusetts 

Incumbent U.S. Senator, Tristam Dalton sought re-election but was eliminated before the third ballot. The third ballot saw the election of George Cabot, who had been a member of the Massachusetts Provincial Congress. Cabot won 87 votes.

New Jersey

New Jersey (regular)

New Jersey (special)

New York 

The election in New York was held January 19, 1791, by the New York State Legislature.

Incumbent Philip Schuyler's term would expire March 3, 1791.

At the State election in April 1790, nominal Federalist majorities were elected to both houses of the 14th New York State Legislature, but many Federalists were friendly to the Democratic-Republican Governor George Clinton, party lines not being drawn very strictly then.

The incumbent Philip Schuyler ran for re-election as the candidate of the Federalist Party. New York State Attorney General Aaron Burr was the candidate of the Democratic-Republican Party, but was at that time a rather moderate politician, opposing the ultras of both parties.

Burr was the choice of both the State Senate and the State Assembly, and was declared elected.  Schuyler was defeated despite the nominal majority of his party. Many of the Federalists took the opportunity to show their disapproval of both Schuyler's haughtiness and the financial policies of Alexander Hamilton, the U.S. Secretary of the Treasury and Schuyler's son-in-law. Besides, the Livingston faction of the Federalist Party felt betrayed after the election of Rufus King over their candidate James Duane in 1789, and now allied themselves with Clinton and later became Democratic-Republicans.

Obs.: Burr had a majority of 5 votes in the Assembly, but the exact number of votes is unclear.

Pennsylvania 

In 1791, the legislature failed to elect due to a disagreement on procedure.  The seat would remain vacant until 1793.

Rhode Island

Vermont 

Stephen R. Bradley and Moses Robinson were elected by the Vermont House of Representatives and Governor and Council in January 1791, anticipating Vermont's admission to the union.  Vermont was admitted as the 14th state on March 4, 1791.  The Senate had adjourned on March 3, at the completion of the 1st United States Congress; the 2nd United States Congress held a one-day session on March 4, and was not scheduled to convene again until October 24.

As a result of this Congressional schedule Bradley and Robinson had not been seated when the Vermont House of Representatives convened in early October, 1791.  At this legislative session, some members suggested that the January election of Bradley and Robinson had been premature, since Vermont had not yet been admitted to the union.  Bradley and Robinson volunteered to resign the credentials of their January elections; on October 17, the Governor and Council voted again, and selected Bradley and Robinson.  The House of Representatives then voted a second time, and also selected Bradley and Robinson.  No vote totals were recorded.

Bradley was selected for the "short term" (Class 3), which expired on March 3, 1795.  Robinson received the "long term" (Class 1), which expired on March 3, 1797.

Virginia 

William Grayson died March 12, 1790, and John Walker was appointed to continue the term.

Virginia (special) 

Future President James Monroe was elected in November 1790 to finish the term.

Virginia (regular) 

Monroe was re-elected in 1791 to the next term, as well.

See also
 1790 United States elections
 1790–91 United States House of Representatives elections
 1st United States Congress
 2nd United States Congress

References

External links 
 Party Division in the Senate, 1789-Present, via Senate.gov
The New York Civil List compiled in 1858 (see: pg. 114 for State senators 1790-91; page 165f for Members of Assembly 1790-91)
 History of Political Parties in the State of New-York by Jabez Delano Hammond (pages 50ff)
The Life and Times of Aaron Burr by James Parton (1866, pages 177ff)